Kalleh Sar or Kaleh Sar or Kolah Sar or Kolleh Sar, also rendered as Galleh Sar, may refer to various places in Iran:

Kolleh Sar, Namin, Ardabil Province
Kaleh Sar, Nir, Ardabil Province
Kalleh Sar, alternate name of Qeshlaq-e Mazan-e Olya, Ardabil Province
Kalleh Sar-e Olya, Ardabil Province
Kalleh Sar-e Sofla, Ardabil Province
Kalleh Sar, Gilan
Kalleh Sar, Hamadan
Kalleh Sar, Qazvin
Kalleh Sar, Zanjan